Nesticus silvestrii is a scaffold web spiders species in the family Nesticidae. It is found in western North America, from British Columbia (Canada) to California (the United States).

See also 
 List of Nesticidae species

References 

silvestrii
Spiders of Canada
Spiders of the United States
Spiders described in 1929